Formby Lake is a lake in Alberta, Canada.

Formby Lake takes its name from Formby, in England.

See also
List of lakes of Alberta

References

Lakes of Alberta